WVKL (95.7 FM) – branded 95-7 R&B – is a commercial urban adult contemporary radio station licensed to serve Norfolk, Virginia. Owned by Audacy, Inc., the station services the Hampton Roads region, and is the market affiliate for The Steve Harvey Morning Show. The WVKL studios are located in Virginia Beach, while the station transmitter resides in nearby Suffolk. In addition to a standard analog transmission, WVKL broadcasts over three HD Radio digital subchannels, and is available online via .

History

This station began operations as WTAR-FM on September 21, 1961, owned by Norfolk Newspapers, publisher of The Virginian-Pilot and The Ledger-Star. Norfolk Newspapers also owned Virginia's first radio station, WTAR (790 AM), and the market's CBS network affiliate, WTAR-TV. There had been a previous WTAR-FM on 97.3 MHz that began broadcasting in 1948, but had ceased operations a couple of years later.

On that tower, a Class B station should be limited to around 16,000 watts, but WVKL continues to enjoy a larger coverage area thanks to its grandfathered power.

By the early 1970s, WTAR-FM was separately programmed, airing a beautiful music format; by 1977, WTAR-FM switched its call sign to WKEZ, with the "EZ" in the call letters referring to easy listening music.

As Norfolk Newspapers began acquiring newspapers and broadcast properties in other states, it was renamed Landmark Communications, and later Landmark Media Enterprises. In the 1970s, the FCC began discouraging one company from owning a newspaper, TV station and radio stations, all in the same media market. Landmark was exempt because it owned the properties before the FCC rules went into effect, but decided to sell WTAR-TV to Knight-Ridder in 1981. WKEZ was concurrently moved to a soft adult contemporary format as WLTY, branded The New Y96. The "LT" stood for both "Lite Music" and the slogan "We Listen To You". WLTY shifted to oldies as The New Oldies 96 in May 1989, and then later as Oldies 95.7.

In 1993, Benchmark Communications spent $4.5 million to buy both WLTY and WTAR.  In 1997, Benchmark sold WLTY to Heritage Broadcasting, which changed WLTY's call letters to WVCL and re-branded as "Cool 95."  The following year, the call sign was modified to WVKL, so instead of "Cool" it became "Kool 95.7."

In February 1998, the Sinclair Broadcast Group acquired WVKL.  In December 1999, the station was bought by Entercom. On January 9, 2001, WVKL switched to its current Urban AC format. Entercom has guided WVKL to becoming one of the top stations in the Norfolk-Virginia Beach-Newport News radio market.

On February 23, 2022, WVKL added The Bet to its HD3 subchannel.

References

External links

VKL
Urban adult contemporary radio stations in the United States
Radio stations established in 1961
Audacy, Inc. radio stations